Daniel Fernando López Rojas (born 6 March 1969) is a Chilean former footballer. He played as a defender during his career.

López also obtained three caps (no goals) for the Chilean national side, making his debut with the squad on 22 March 1994.

References

1969 births
Living people
People from Ovalle
Chilean footballers
Chile international footballers
Association football defenders
Coquimbo Unido footballers
C.D. Antofagasta footballers
Club Deportivo Universidad Católica footballers
Audax Italiano footballers
Chilean Primera División players
1993 Copa América players